Bambali is a town in eastern Gambia. It is located in Upper Baddibu District in the North Bank Division.  As of 2012, it has an estimated population of 1,264.

References

External links
Satellite map at Maplandia

Populated places in the Gambia